Avadh Behari Bhatia (1921–September 27, 1984) was a Canadian physicist who worked on “electronic transport theory and the study of diffraction of light by ultrasonic waves” and whose research benefited condensed matter physicists and astrophysicists.

Born in India, Bhatia studied at the Universities of Allahabad in Uttar Pradesh and the University of Liverpool (under Herbert Fröhlich) in the UK. The latter place was where he met his second wife in the late 1940s. The couple were married in Rajasthan, India and lived in Gujarat for two years before Dr. Bhatia went to work at the University of Edinburgh under Max Born.  

His immigration to Canada was made possible by a fellowship from the National Research Council.

Bhatia joined the University of Alberta in 1955 and was director of the Theoretical Physics Institute there from 1964 to 1969. 

He wrote in a chapter in Principles of Optics on the diffraction of light by ultrasonic waves and his book Ultrasonic Absorption was published by Oxford University Press in 1967. He co-authored Mechanics of Deformable Media with R.N. Singh. Some of his publications are as A.B. Bhatia.

Bhatia’s second wife was June Huband, a celebrated British-born novelist and memoirist who wrote under the pen name Helen Forrester; they had one son, Robert Bhatia. The younger Bhatia wrote a book about his parents and their relationship called Passage Across the Mersey (2017).

Bhatia died after a “long illness” and is buried in Saint Anthony Cemetery, Edmonton, Alberta, Canada.

References

External links 
 A.B. Bhatia - researchgate.net

Canadian physicists
1984 deaths